Rivière-Mistassini is an unorganized territory in the Canadian province of Quebec, located in the regional county municipality of Maria-Chapdelaine. The territory had a population of 27 as of the Canada 2021 Census, and covered a land area of 17,629.74 km2.

The eponymous Mistassini River has its source in the far northern part of the territory and entirely bisects it from north to south.

Demographics
Population trend:
 Population in 2021: 27 (2016 to 2021 population change: -44.9%)
 Population in 2016: 49 
 Population in 2011: 31 
 Population in 2006: 10
 Population in 2001: 0
 Population in 1996: 0
 Population in 1991: 0

Private dwellings occupied by usual residents: 16 (total dwellings: 20)

References

Unorganized territories in Saguenay–Lac-Saint-Jean
Maria-Chapdelaine Regional County Municipality